Bradford City AFC Women is an English women's football club which represents the city of Bradford, West Yorkshire. Previously under the title of Bradford City Women's FC, the club announced its merger with Bradford City AFC in January 2021, through the Football in the Community Foundation, and has since adopted the name Bradford City AFC Women and Girls

After realigning the club with its former junior girls set up, Bradford City AFC Women has a player pathway from Under 9's through to Senior Football. A new Under 23's Development Team will be launched for the 2021–22 season, with an aim of providing a stronger pathway for the young women of Bradford to play National League football.

History

Early years
Founded in 1988 under the auspices of Bradford City's Football in the Community department, the club became founder members of the Yorkshire and Humberside League the following year. After success at local level, the club won promotion into the FA Women's Premier League Northern Division in 1996. The club earned a second successive promotion in 1996–97, into the top level of Women's football in England.

In 1997–98 the club avoided relegation and also reached the semi–final of the FA Women's Premier League Cup – losing on penalties to eventual winners Arsenal after a 2–2 draw. This was despite Arsenal's goalkeeper Sarah Reed being sent–off and defender Tina Mapes taking over in goal. City dropped out of the top division in 1998–99, and suffered a further relegation in 1999–00, into the Northern Combination Women's Football League.

Modern era
The club gained promotion back to the FA Women's Premier League ahead of the 2013/2014 season. In 2017/18 striker Laura Elford was among the WPL Northern top scorers. Only Leicester's Rosie Axten (30), and Middlesbrough's Emily Scarr (28) scored more than Elford's 25 in all competitions.

Following announcement that long serving Chairwoman Sally Thackray would step down, discussion began with a number of parties over the future running of the club. It was announced on 17 December 2020 that the club would move under the stewardship of Bradford City Football in the Community. This would mark the first time in the clubs history that it stood as a part of the 'men's' club at Bradford City AFC. As well as this, the club announced a restructure of its previous committee model, to one that fits into the new system, with Qasim Akhtar announced as the clubs first General Manager, overseeing the day-to-day running of the club

Stadium
The club currently shares Eccleshill United's Mitton Group Stadium, having previously played home matches at Thackley FC's Dennyfield ground, Peel Park and the grounds of Bradford Park Avenue and Guiseley.

Current squad

Individual Awards

Player of the Year

Captains

The following is a list of the officially appointed captains of the Bradford City WFC first-team.

Honours 

 Northern Combination Women's Football League:
 Winners (1): 1995–96
 FA Women's Premier League Northern Division:
 Winners (1): 1996–97

Link with Bradford City A.F.C.
Bradford City Women have always traditionally adopted the colours of Bradford City AFC, despite no formal link between the two clubs. In 2015 BCWFC adopted the same crest and kits as the men's side in order to bring relationships closer together, gaining further support publicly from the club, in particular, the women's team were favoured as a natural exit route for players from Bradford City's girls Centre of Excellence before its closure. Recently, the clubs has both co–operated with sports charity One in a Million with its Junior Girls set-up.

In 2008 an exhibition on the women's team was staged at the bantamspast museum at Valley Parade, with the aim of forging closer links between the clubs.

The women's Under–16 section played at Wembley Stadium as a curtain-raiser to the 1996 Football League Second Division play-off Final.

As of 2021 Bradford City Women's has been brought under the umbrella of Bradford City AFC, through the clubs community department, and the adoption of the clubs new title as Bradford City AFC Women, signifying the club as the official Women's side of Bradford City. This merger also realigned the clubs Girls junior set up, ahead of plans to form an official girls academy pathway, leading into a new Under 23's set up. Ryan Sparks, CEO of Bradford City, announced the merger to all staff in January 2021 stating that "No longer will we have Bradford City AFC and Bradford City WFC, but just Bradford City AFC with both Men's and Women's teams"

Seasons

Key

 P = Played
 W = Games won
 D = Games drawn
 L = Games lost
 F = Goals for
 A = Goals against
 Pts = Points
WSL = Women's Super League
PL National = FA Women's Premier League National Division
PL North = FA Women's Premier League Northern Division
Northern Comb = Northern Combination Women's Football League
NE Prem= North East Women's Regional League Premier Division
NE Div 1 (S) = North East Women's Regional League Division One South

 QR1 = First Qualifying Round
 QR2 = Second Qualifying Round
 QR3 = Third Qualifying Round
 R1 = Round 1
 R2 = Round 2
 R3 = Round 3
 R4 = Round 4
 R5 = Round 5
 R6 = Round 6
 QF = Quarter-finals
 SF = Semi-finals
 RU = Runner Up
 F = Final

Division shown in bold when it changes due to promotion or relegation.
Top scorer shown in bold with  when they set or equalled a club record.

References

External links
Official site
Soccerway

 
Women's football clubs in England
Association football clubs established in 1988
Football clubs in West Yorkshire
Sport in Bradford
Bradford City A.F.C.
1988 establishments in England
FA Women's National League teams